Patrice de Mullenheim (born 10 November 1949) is a French former sports shooter. He competed in the 50 metre rifle, three positions event at the 1972 Summer Olympics.

References

1949 births
Living people
French male sport shooters
Olympic shooters of France
Shooters at the 1972 Summer Olympics
Place of birth missing (living people)